Diego Carlos de Oliveira, known as Diego Carlos (born 15 May 1988) is a Brazilian former footballer who played as a winger.

Career
Carlos made his debut in the Russian First Division for FC Nizhny Novgorod on 4 April 2011 in a game against FC Volgar-Gazprom Astrakhan where he scored 2 goals. On 24 January 2017, he left FC Ufa after his contract was terminated.

On 16 March 2017, Carlos returned to Brazil, signing for São Bento which competed in Serie C, the third tier of Brazilian football. On 8 August, Carlos signed for Indian Super League franchise Pune City. He continued playing for FC Pune City in the 2018–19 season.

Career statistics

References

1988 births
Sportspeople from Minas Gerais
Living people
Brazilian footballers
Association football forwards
Duque de Caxias Futebol Clube players
Sport Club Corinthians Alagoano players
Brazilian expatriate footballers
Expatriate footballers in Russia
FC Nizhny Novgorod (2007) players
FC Luch Vladivostok players
FC Ufa players
Russian Premier League players
FC Pune City players
Mumbai City FC players
Indian Super League players